Acanthinucella is a genus of sea snails, marine gastropod mollusks in the family Muricidae, the murex snails or rock snails.

Species
Species within the genus Acanthinucella include:

References

Ocenebrinae